FK Ljubanci 1974 is a football club based in the village of Ljubanci near Skopje, Republic of Macedonia. They was recently played in the Macedonian Second League.

History
The club was founded in 1974.

Current squad
As of 8 July 2015

References

External links
Club info at MacedonianFootball 
Football Federation of Macedonia 

Ljubanci
Association football clubs established in 1974
1974 establishments in the Socialist Republic of Macedonia